Parthenstein is a municipality in the Leipzig district in Saxony, Germany. It was created in 1994 by the merger of the former municipalities Grethen, Großsteinberg, Klinga and Pomßen.

References 

Leipzig (district)